Alingan is a Hindi film starring Tushar Purwar, Anil Rastogi ,Vivek Anand Mishra and Prashant Rai in lead roles. Film has been shot at Varanasi , Prayagraj and Bhadrawah in Jammu. It was released on 25 March 2022.

Plot
Alingan is a story of a 21-year-old boy Kabir whose father is a rich business man and mother is a housewife. His father doesn't treat his mother well. His father sends him to Shimla for higher studies so that he doesn't remain uneducated like his mother. When he returns after completing his studies, he had a tiff with his father. He decides to leave everything behind and embarks on a journey to find his identity. Kabir met different people with different difficulties. During this time he realizes that if he attains salvation, then he will be free from all the hassles of the world.

Cast
 Tushar Purwar as Kabir  
 Anil Rastogi
 Vivek Anand Mishra
 Prashant Rai
 Hiral Acharya
 Zoya Khan 
 Akhilesh Jain
 Pritti Cheshta
 Rahul Rajput

References

External links 
 Alingan (2022) | Alingan Movie | Alingan Bollywood Movie Cast & Crew, Release Date, Review, Photos, Videos
 Alingan

2022 drama films
2020s Hindi-language films
2022 films
Indian drama films